Ahror Iminov (born 14 July 1987) is a Kyrgyzstani businessman. He has been the vice president of the Wrestling Federation of the Kyrgyz Republic since 2018. In 2020, he was elected for parliament, but following the 2020 Kyrgyz protests the election results were annulled.

References

External links 
 Iminov's interview with Limon.kg
 Iminov's interview with Kaktus

Living people
1987 births
People from Osh